
The third European Parliament election by direct universal suffrage, took place in June 1989. The citizens of twelve countries elected overall 518 MEPs for a term of five years.

MEPs by Country
MEPs for Belgium 1989–1994
MEPs for Denmark 1989–1994
MEPs for France 1989–1994
MEPs for Greece 1989–1994
MEPs for (West) Germany 1989–1994
MEP observers for East Germany 1991–1994
MEPs for Ireland 1989–1994
MEPs for Italy 1989–1994
MEPs for Luxembourg 1989–1994
List of members of the European Parliament for the Netherlands, 1989–1994
MEPs for Spain 1989–1994
MEPs for Portugal 1989–1994
MEPs for the UK 1989–1994

A
Gordon Adam
Maria Aglietta
Sylviane Ainardi
Alexandros Alavanos
Siegbert Alber
Mechthild von Alemann
Jean-Marie Alexandre
Claude Allegre
Michèle Alliot-Marie
José Álvarez de Paz
Rui Amaral
Gianfranco Amendola
Georgios Anastassopoulos
Hedy d'Ancona
Anne André-Léonard
Niall Andrews
Didier Anger
Bernard Antony
José Apolinário
Víctor Manuel Arbeloa Muru
Aline Archimbaud
Javier Areitio Toledo
Miguel Arias Cañete
Marie-Christine Aulas
Claude Autant-Lara
Paraskevas Avgerinos

B
Gianni Baget Bozzo
Richard Balfe
Juan María Bandrés Molet
Mary Banotti
José Barata Moura
Enrique Barón Crespo
Heribert Barrera
José Barros Moura
Roger Barton
Michèle Barzach
Roberto Barzanti
Charles Baur
Christopher Beazley
Peter Beazley
Luis Filipe Pais Beirôco
Maria Belo
Jean-Paul Benoit
Pierre Bernard-Reymond
Jan Bertens
Nicholas Bethell
Virginio Bettini
Vincenzo Bettiza
Bouke Beumer
Rosaria Bindi
John Bird
Birgit Bjornvig
Freddy Blak
Neil Blaney
Yvan Blot
Reinhold Bocklet
Reimer Böge
Pedro Bofill Abeilhe
Bruno Boissière
Alain Bombard
Jens-Peter Bonde
Andrea Bonetti
Rinaldo Bontempi
Franco Borgo
Jean-Louis Borloo
Jean-Louis Bourlanges
David Bowe
Jürgen Brand
Ursula Braun-Moser
Georges de Brémonds d'Ars
Hiltrud Breyer
Yvon Briant
Mathilde van den Brink
Rogério Brito
Elmar Brok
Carlos María Bru Purón
Janey O'Neil Buchan
Martine Buron

C
Jesús Cabezón Alonso
Rafael Calvo Ortega
Juan José de la Cámara Martínez
Pío Cabanillas Gallas
Pedro Manuel Canavarro
Eusebio Cano Pinto
António Capucho
Antonio Cariglia
Pierre Carniti
Carlos Carvalhas
José Vicente Carvalho Cardoso
Carlo Casini
José Ramón Caso Garcia
Maria Luisa Cassanmagnago Cerretti
Bryan Cassidy
Luciana Castellina
Anna Catasta
Fred Catherwood
Gérard Caudron
Janine Cayet
Adriana Ceci
Pierre Ceyrac
Henry Chabert
Raphaël Chanterie
Raymond Chesa
Claude Cheysson
Mauro Chiabrando
Frode Nør Christensen
Ib Christensen
Ejner Hovgård Christiansen
Efthymios Christodoulou
Gaetano Cingari
Ken Coates
Yves Cochet
Carlos Coelho
António Antero Coimbra Martins
Juan Colino Salamanca
Kenneth Collins
Emilio Colombo
Joan Colom I Naval
Renée Conan
Felice Contu
Patrick Mark Cooney
Maria Teresa Coppo Gavazzi
Francesco Corleone
Petrus Cornelissen
Jean-Pierre Cot
Pat Cox
Birgit Cramon Daiber
Peter Crampton
João Cravinho
Christine Crawley
Bettino Craxi
Artur da Cunha Oliveira
John Cushnahan

D
Joachim Dalsass
Margaret Daly
Pieter Dankert
Wayne David
Michel Debatisse
Willy De Clercq
Jean Defraigne
Biagio de Giovanni
Karel De Gucht
Claude Delcroix
Robert Delorozoy
Aldo de Matteo
Marie-José Denys
Cesare de Piccoli
Gérard Deprez
Proinsias de Rossa
Claude Desama
Andrea Carmine De Simone
Barry Desmond
Dimitrios Dessylas
Lorenzo de Vitto
Gijs de Vries
Mario Dido'
Carmen Díez De Rivera Icaza
Nel van Dijk
Karel Dillen
Marguerite-Marie Dinguirard
Elio Di Rupo
Teresa Domingo Segarra
François-Xavier de Donnea
Alan Donnelly
Philippe Douste-Blazy
José Manuel Duarte Cendán
Bárbara Dührkop Dührkop
Raymonde Dury
Maurice Duverger

E
James Elles
Michael Elliott
Mireille Elmalan
Vassilis Ephremidis
Brigitte Ernst de la Graete
Arturo Juan Escuder Croft
José Antonio Escudero
Nicolas Estgen
Winifred Ewing

F
Laurent Fabius
Alexander Falconer
Enrico Falqui
Antonio Fantini
Giulio Fantuzzi
Gipo Farassino
Ben Fayot
Gerardo Fernández-Albor
Solange Fernex
Giuliano Ferrara
Concepció Ferrer
Enrico Ferri
Gianfranco Fini
Gene Fitzgerald
Jim Fitzsimons
Colette Flesch
Karl-Heinz Florenz
Nicole Fontaine
Glyn Ford
Arnaldo Forlani
Roberto Formigoni
Mario Forte
André Fourçans
Yves Frémion
Ingo Friedrich
Bernard Frimat
François Froment-Meurice
Gérard Fuchs
Honor Funk

G
Gerardo Gaibisso
Yves Galland
Marc Galle
Giulio Cesare Gallenzi
Max Gallo
Juan Antonio Gangoiti Llaguno
Juan Carlos Garaikoetxea Urriza
Vasco Garcia
Manuel García Amigo
Ludivina García Arias
Carles-Alfred Gasòliba I Böhm
Charles de Gaulle
Jas Gawronski
Des Geraghty
Marietta Giannakou-Koutsikou
José María Gil-Robles Gil-Delgado
Valéry Giscard d'Estaing
Ernest Glinne
Annemarie Goedmakers
Willi Görlach
Bruno Gollnisch
Fernando Manuel Santos Gomes
Laura González Álvarez
Giovanni Goria
Friedrich-Wilhelm Graefe zu Baringdorf
Pauline Green
Maxime François Gremetz
Lissy Gröner
Johanna-Christina Grund
Maren Günther
Guy Jean Guermeur
Francesco Guidolin
François Guillaume
Antoni Gutiérrez Díaz

H
Otto von Habsburg
Menelaos Chatzigeorgiou
Klaus Hänsch
Helga Haller von Hallerstein
José Happart
Lyndon Harrison
Jean-Paul Heider
Fernand Herman
Anna Hermans
Robert Hersant
Michel Hervé
Philippe A.R. Herzog
Michael J. Hindley
Magdalene Hoff
Martin Holzfuss
Geoffrey Hoon
Karsten Friedrich Hoppenstedt
Jean-François Hory
Paul Howell
Stephen Hughes
John Hume

I
Franco Iacono
Renzo Imbeni
Richard Inglewood
Antonio Iodice
Marie Anne Isler Béguin
John Iversen
María Izquierdo Rojo

J
Caroline Jackson
Christopher Jackson
Erhard Jakobsen
James Janssen van Raay
Georg Jarzembowski
Kirsten Jensen
Marie Jepsen
Claire Joanny
Karin Junker
Alain Juppé

K
Emmanouil Karellis
Edward Kellett-Bowman
Hedwig Keppelhoff-Wiechert
Mark Killilea
Egon Klepsch
Heinz Fritz Köhler
Klaus-Peter Köhler
Niels Anker Kofoed
Sotiris Kostopoulos
Robert Ernest Krieps
Annemarie Kuhn

L
Jeannou Lacaze
José María Lafuente López
Efstathios Lagakos
Lelio Lagorio
Patrick Joseph Lalor
Giorgio La Malfa
Francesco Lamanna
Alain Lamassoure
Panayotis Lambrias
Karmelo Landa Mendibe
Patrick Lane
Brigitte Langenhagen
Alexander Langer
Horst Langes
Paul Lannoye
Antonio la Pergola
Jessica Larive
Nereo Laroni
Pierre Lataillade
Louis Lauga
Jean-Marie le Chevallier
Martine Lehideux
Gerd Ludwig Lemmer
Marlene Lenz
Jean-Marie Le Pen
Salvatore Lima
Rolf Linkohr
Dionysios Livanos
Carmen Llorca Villaplana
Calogero lo Giudice
Alfred Lomas
Francisco António Lucas Pires
Günter Lüttge
Astrid Lulling
Rudolf Luster

M
John Joseph McCartin
Henry Bell McCubbin
Michael McGowan
Anne Caroline Mcintosh
Hugh McMahon
Edward Mcmillan-Scott
Alain Madelin
Maria Magnani Noya
Thomas Joseph Maher
Gepa Maibaum
Hanja Maij-Weggen
Kurt Malangré
Christian de la Malène
Claude Malhuret
Bernie Malone
Agostino Mantovani
Pol Marck
Luís Marinho
Alain Marleix
António Joaquim Marques Mendes
David Martin
Simone Martin
Jean-Claude Martinez
Vincenzo Mattina
Sylvie Mayer
Antonio Mazzone
Nora Mebrak-Zaïdi
Manuel Medina Ortega
Thomas Megahy
Bruno Mégret
Eugenio Melandri
Arne Melchior
Mario Melis
José Mendes Bota
Íñigo Méndez de Vigo
Winfried Menrad
Friedrich Merz
Alman Metten
Alberto Michelini
Karl-Heinrich Mihr
Joaquim Miranda
Ana Miranda De Lage
Pietro Mitolo
Gérard Monnier-Besombes
José María Montero Zabala
Aymeri de Montesquiou Fezensac
James Moorhouse
Fernando Morán López
Luigi Moretti
Raúl Morodo Leoncio
David Morris
Giuseppe Mottola
Gerd Müller
Günther Müller
Werner Münch
Hemmo Muntingh
Cristiana Muscardini
François Musso

N
Pasqualina Napoletano
Vito Napoli
Giorgio Napolitano

Harald Neubauer
Arthur Stanley Newens
Edward Newman
Bill Newton Dunn
Dimitrios Nianias
James Nicholson
Tove Nielsen
Jean-Thomas Nordmann

O
Achille Occhetto
Christine Margaret Oddy
Charles Towneley Strachey, 4th Baron O'Hagan
Francisco Oliva Garcia
Gérard Onesta
Leyla Onur
Ria Oomen-Ruijten
Arie Oostlander
Marcelino Oreja
Leopoldo Ortiz Climent

P
Pedro Pacheco Herrera
Doris Pack
Dimitrios Pagoropoulos
Ian Paisley
Gabriele Panizzi
Marco Pannella
Mihalis Papagiannakis
Christos Papoutsis
Eolo Parodi
Karl Partsch
Jean-Claude Pasty
George Benjamin Patterson
Karla Peijs
Jean Penders
Virgílio Pereira
Fernando Pérez Royo
Carlos Perreau De Pinninck Domenech
Hartmut Perschau
Nicole Pery
Ioannis Pesmazoglou
Helwin Peter
Johannes Wilhelm Peters
Willi Piecyk
Dorothee Piermont
Filippos Pierros
Carlos Pimenta
Michel Pinton
Karel Pinxten
René-Emile Piquet
Fritz Pirkl
Ferruccio Pisoni
Nino Pisoni
Luis Planas
Charles Henry Plumb
Hans-Gert Pöttering
Lydie Polfer
Anita Jean Pollack
José Javier Pomés Ruiz
Alain Pompidou
Josep Pons Grau
Giacomo Porrazzini
Manuel Porto
José Domingo Posada González
Derek Prag
Peter Price
Bartho Pronk
Christopher Prout
Elda Pucci
Alonso José Puerta
Eduard Punset
Maartje van Putten

Q
Jean Querbes
Godelieve Quisthoudt-Rowohl
Eva-Maria Quistorp

R
Jean-Pierre Raffarin
Jean-Pierre Raffin
Georgios Raftopoulos
Andrea Raggio
Juan de Dios Ramírez Heredia
Christa Randzio-Plath
Giuseppe Rauti
Patricia Rawlings
Imelda Mary Read
Viviane Reding
Tullio Eugenio Regge
Marc Reymann
Sérgio Ribeiro
Günter Rinsche
Klaus Riskær Pedersen
Carlos Robles Piquer
Joanna Rønn
Dieter Rogalla
Georgios Romeos
Domènec Romera I Alcàzar
Edoardo Ronchi
Frédéric Rosmini
Giorgio Rossetti
Claudia Roth
Dagmar Roth-Behrendt
Mechtild Rothe
Willi Rothley
Panayotis Roumeliotis
Christian Foldberg Rovsing
Xavier Rubert de Ventós
Mario Giovanni Guerriero Ruffini
Guadalupe Ruiz-Giménez Aguilar
José María Ruiz-Mateos Jiménez de Tejada

S
Henri Saby
Bernhard Sälzer
André Sainjon
Jannis Sakellariou
Margarida Salema Martins
Heinke Salisch
Detlev Samland
Isidoro Sánchez García
Ulla Margrethe Sandbæk
Maria Amélia Santos
Diego de los Santos López
Francisco Javier Sanz Fernández
Enrique Sapena Granell
Georgios Saridakis
Pavlos Sarlis
Gabriele Sboarina
Edgar Josef Schiedermeier
Dieter Schinzel
Marcel Schlechter
Emil Schlee
Ursula Schleicher
Gerhard Schmid
Barbara Schmidbauer
Hans-Günter Schodruch
Franz Schönhuber
Léon Schwartzenberg
James Scott-Hopkins
Barry Seal
Madron Richard Seligman
Mateo Sierra Bardají
Max Simeoni
Richard Simmonds
Barbara Simons
Anthony Simpson
Brian Simpson
Joaquín Sisó Cruellas
Alex Smith
Llewellyn Smith
Jan Sonneveld
André Soulier
Roberto Speciale
Tom Spencer
Francesco Enrico Speroni
Paul Staes
Ioannis Stamoulis
Franz-Ludwig Schenk Graf von Stauffenberg
Konstantinos Stavrou
John Stevens
George Stevenson
Kenneth Stewart
Jack Stewart-Clark
Fernando Suárez González

T
Marco Taradash
Giuseppe Tatarella
Jacques Tauran
Djida Tazdaït
Wilfried Telkämper
Anna Terrón I Cusí
Bernard Thareau
Diemut Theato
Marianne Thyssen
Leo Tindemans
Gary Titley
John Tomlinson (politician)
Carole Tongue
Günter Topmann
José Manuel Torres Couto
Catherine Trautmann
Renzo Trivelli
Konstantinos Tsimas
Amédée Turner

U
Dick Ukeiwé

V
Dacia Valent
José Valverde López
Jaak Vandemeulebroucke
Marijke van Hemeldonck
Jean-Marie Vanlerenberghe
Lode van Outrive
Marie-Claude Vayssade
José Vázquez Fouz
Luciano Vecchi
Simone Veil
Wim van Velzen
Herman Verbeek
Josep Verde I Aldea
Maxime Verhagen
Jacques Vernier
Luigi Vertemati
Yves Verwaerde
Bruno Visentini
Ben Visser
Kurt Vittinghoff
Manfred Vohrer
Dominique Voynet
Thomas von der Vring
Leen van der Waal

W
Antoine Waechter
Gerd Walter
Beate Weber
Rüdiger von Wechmar
Michael Welsh
Norman West
Klaus Wettig
Ian White
Florus Wijsenbeek
Anthony Joseph Wilson
Karl von Wogau
Eisso Woltjer
Francis Wurtz
Terence Wynn

Z
Axel Zarges
Georgios Zavvos
Adrien Zeller

See also
 Member of the European Parliament
 List of members of the European Parliament 1989–1994
 1989 European Parliament election